Langdi is a traditional Indian field sport played in Pandiyan Dynasty called "Nondiyaattam" , similar to hopscotch. The teams alternate chasing (attacking) and defending roles in each of the 4 innings of the game, with the chasing team's players restricted to hopping around on one foot, and attempting to score points by tagging as many defenders as possible within the 9 minutes of each inning. It is described by Marathis as a sport with a Marathi ethos.

Langdi is considered to be useful in training for sports like kho kho, volleyball and gymnastics. The National Langdi Federation received national recognition in 2010.

Langdi in Maharashtra is a popular childhood pastime, it is described as the foundation of all sports. Suresh Gandhi, Secretary of Langdi Federation of India acknowledges playing langdi isn't financially rewarding. Stake holders have to arrange for funds out of their own resources. Mumbai University will be the first Indian university to introduce langdi at the college level, for female students thus revitalising the traditional sport. 5 lakh female students study in the university in 700 colleges affiliated to it. C. N. Vidyamandir, a school in Ahmedabad, encourages participation in traditional sports such as langdi as these cost less money to play and are mentally and physically refreshing for children addicted to the electronic media and games. According to Mahesh Vichare writing in Maharashtra Times, English medium schools, both secular and those run by Christian institutions, in Mumbai, tend to neglect traditional sports like langdi. Chauhan, national president of Krida Bharati, has stressed that the organisation would endeavour to revitalise traditional sports like langdi in order to create healthy youngsters. Krida bharati is an organisation that promotes sport in India. According to Arun Deshmukh, recognition from the Indian Olympic Association is in the pipeline. This recognition results in facilities like concessional railway travel being made available, thus ensuring in growth of the sport.

Expatriate Indians have associated in the effort to popularise langdi in other countries, such as Thailand. Video films of the sport being played have been prepared in order raise interest internationally.

Brief Rules
The rules of this sport have been standardised by the Akhil Maharashtra Sharirik Shikshan Mandal.

Langdi is a team sport between two sides, played 12 players a side, and an additional three extra players. A match lasts 36 minutes. It is played in four innings of nine minutes each, with the teams alternating roles in each inning. The team that wins the toss defends. The chasing team sends chasers who hop on one foot and try to tag the defenders. The chasers can step out of the ground as long as they keep on one foot. The defenders are declared out if they step out of the ground or commit a line fault. The team that tags most defenders is declared the winner.

National events
The fourth National Men's and Women's Langdi Championship was held in Chandigarh, in May 2013.

References

Traditional sports of India
Sports originating in India
Sport in Maharashtra
Culture of Maharashtra
Tag variants